René Obermann (born 5 March 1963) is a German businessman who currently serves as Co-Head of Warburg Pincus International LLC's European operations, and also serves as Chairman of the Board of Directors of Airbus SE since 16 April 2020. He was previously (from 13 November 2006 until 31 December 2013) CEO of Deutsche Telekom AG.

Early life 
Obermann was born in Düsseldorf and was raised in Krefeld. After graduating high school and completing military service, where he spent two years in the air force, he started his professional career at BMW in Munich and completed a business apprenticeship programme in 1986. From 1986 to 1988, he studied economics at Westfälische Wilhelms-Universität in Münster.

Career 
Also in 1986, Obermann founded his own company ABC Telekom (now The Phone House Telecom GmbH), located in Münster, Germany. Andreas Gerdes was his business partner from 1988 to 1992.

He gave up studying after 2 years due to the successful development of ABC. In 1991, ABC Telekom merged with Hutchison Whampoa Ltd. and became Hutchison Mobilfunk GmbH. Obermann was Managing Partner from 1992 to 1993 and Chief Executive Officer from 1993 to 1998.

After having sold his remaining shares, Obermann started his career at Deutsche Telekom Group, first at T-Mobile Deutschland GmbH as a Member of the Executive Board. From March 2000 to March 2002 he was CEO of T-Mobile Deutschland. In June 2001, he additionally became CEO Europe at T-Mobile International AG. In November 2002, he became Board Member of Deutsche Telekom AG and was then appointed as CEO of the group's mobile division, T-Mobile International AG. He took over the last two roles from Kai-Uwe Ricke who was appointed as CEO of Deutsche Telekom AG.

After Ricke had resigned in 2006, Obermann became the CEO of Deutsche Telekom AG. During Obermann's tenure as CEO, he was instrumental in obtaining an exclusive partnership from Apple Inc. for Deutsche Telekom to sell the original iPhone in Germany and in other European countries in late-2007. Other successes were the German market leadership, the merger of Orange UK and T-Mobile UK to Everything Everywhere (now EE Limited) and the merger of MetroPCS with T-Mobile USA in the US and its subsequent IPO. In 2012, Obermann also took over responsibility for innovation in the group.

From February 2007 to November 2013, Obermann was Vice President of Germany's digital association BITKOM.

Obermann left Deutsche Telekom in December 2013 and assumed the role of CEO of the Dutch cable and internet provider, Ziggo. His decision was already published in 2012 – he wanted to go back to a more operational role – back into the 'machine room' where he came from. In 2014 it became public that Ziggo would become takeover target of Liberty Global. Obermann announced that he would therefore leave the company upon completion of the merger, which took place at the end of 2014.

In February 2015, Obermann became Partner and Managing Director at Warburg Pincus International LLC. In April 2016, Obermann became a member of the advisory board of the German Internet Economy Foundation, which supports the German and European digital economy.

René Obermann is also a partner in US-based private equity firm Warburg Pincus and a managing director of Warburg Pincus Deutschland GmbH.

In April 2020, Obermann became Chairman of the Board of Directors of Airbus SE, succeeding Denis Ranque.

Other activities

Corporate boards 
 Airbus SE Chairman of the Board of Directors (since 2020)
 Telenor Group Member of the Board of Directors (2018–2019)
 Allianz Deutschland AG, Member of the Supervisory Board (2017–2020)
 inexio Beteiligungs GmbH & Co. KGaA, Member of the Supervisory Board (2017–2020)
 Inmarsat, Non-Executive Member of the Board of Directors
IONOS Internet Holding SE, Chairman of the Supervisory Board (since 2017)
 Strato AG, Chairman of the Supervisory Board (since 2017) 
 Die Zeit, Member of the Editorial Board (2017–2019)
 CompuGroup Medical SE, Member of the Supervisory Board (2015–2017)
 Spotify Technology SA, Member of the Supervisory Board (2014–2016)
 E.ON SE, Member of the Supervisory Board (2011–2016)
 ThyssenKrupp AG, Member of the Supervisory Board (2013–2018)

Non-profit organizations 
 German Startups Association, Member of the Board of Trustees (since 2019)
 German Association for Information Technology, Telecommunications and New Media (BITKOM), Vice-President (2007–2013)

Personal life 

Obermann married German television presenter Maybrit Illner in August 2010. He also has two children from a previous marriage.

References 

1963 births
Deutsche Telekom
German chief executives
People from Krefeld
Living people